The Ministry of Finance and Public Credit, is the national executive ministry of the Government of Colombia responsible for the financial and budgetary matters of the country as well as implementing the financial policies passed by Congress, equivalent to the finance ministries of other countries.

The Ministry was created on 18 July 1923 by fusing together the existing Ministries of Finance and of the Treasury.

The Ministry of Finance and Public Credit is active in developing financial inclusion policy and is a member of the Alliance for Financial Inclusion.

List of Ministers of Finance and Public Credit

References

 
Colombia
Finance in Colombia
Finance And Public Credit